Mats Roland Willner (born 24 April 1968) is a Swedish journalist, author and Arsenal supporter. He currently works as sports editor at the Norrköpings Tidningar where he has been a long-standing sports journalist. He is famous for supporting Arsenal FC and visits about 8 games per year. He is co-founder and former chairman of Arsenal Sweden.

In April 2007 he gained popularity in his article series 'Willners Week', which includes his reviews of the Stadium's sausages.

References 

1968 births
Living people
Swedish sports journalists